LAT TV was a Spanish-language television network emphasizing family-oriented and educational programming. It was owned by Latin America Broadcasting of Houston, Texas and launched in May 2006, initially on five low-power television stations in Texas and Arizona, four of which were in top-ten Hispanic markets. The network folded in May 2008.

History
LAT TV launched on May 19, 2006 with television stations in Houston, Austin, Dallas-Fort Worth and San Antonio, Texas, and in Phoenix, Arizona. On April 10, 2007, LAT TV announced a partnership with Equity Media Holdings that would affiliate 26 stations owned or controlled by Equity with LAT TV, effective May 30, 2007. The new affiliation expanded LAT TV coverage to 31 stations and to 27 markets in 15 states.

Citing a lack of investments caused by a lack of cable carriage, the network shut down May 20, 2008. The company planned to retain its broadcast licenses, but ultimately would sell its stations to other parties soon after.

Programming
LAT TV was headed by Patricia Torres-Burd and her team.

LAT TV offered a wide variety of programming from Mexico, Latin America, Europe and the United States to serve a diverse Hispanic market. The schedule included telenovelas, sports, comedy, and children's programming. A half-hour network news program from Independent News Network, Noticias LAT TV, aired each night. Weekday mornings included a block of public-service programs. Friday nights featured boxing matches, Late Night Variety Show "La Boca Loca De Paul" hosted by Paul Bouche, and the afternoon children's programming block includes Topo Gigio, a show that has been popular in the Latino community since the 1960s.

Technology
LAT TV was entirely based on internet protocol. Its IT Manager Aaron Ward and network operations manager Jay Ross built and oversaw the process.

LAT TV Stations

Network-owned
 KCVH-LD channel 30, Houston, Texas (LAT TV flagship station; now owned by Daij Media)
 KVPA-LD channel 42, Phoenix, Arizona (now owned by Liberman Broadcasting)

Affiliates
Charter affiliates
 KVAT-LD channel 17, Austin, Texas
 KJJM-LP channel 34, Dallas, Texas
 KISA-LD channel 40, San Antonio, Texas

Affiliates added May 30, 2007
 KRBF-LP channel 59, Fayetteville, Arkansas
 K32GH channel 32, Fort Smith, Arkansas - repeating KRBF-LP
 KHUG-LP channel 14, Little Rock, Arkansas
 KWBF, channel 42, Little Rock, Arkansas - digital subchannel, repeating KHUG-LP (ceased January 2008; subchannel given to KATV due to collapse of KATV Tower)
 K20HZ channel 20, Palm Springs, California
 KIMG-LP channel 23, Ventura, California
 W43CE channel 43, St. Petersburg, Florida
 WSLF-LP channel 35, Port Saint Lucie, Florida
 WYGA-CA channel 55, Atlanta, Georgia
 WUHQ-LP channel 29, Grand Rapids, Michigan
 WJXF-LP channel 49, Jackson, Mississippi
 KEGS-LP channel 30, Las Vegas, Nevada
 K64GJ channel 64, Lawton, Oklahoma
 KUOK-CA channel 11, Oklahoma City, Oklahoma
 KADY-LP channel 34, Sherman, Texas
 KCBU channel 3 (DT), Price, Utah - digital subchannel
 KDEV channel 11 (DT), Cheyenne, Wyoming  - digital subchannel

Announced for affiliation, but did not carry the network
 KHBS channel 40, Fort Smith, Arkansas - digital subchannel, repeating KRBF-LP
 W56EJ channel 56, Gainesville, Florida - was not on the air as of December 2007; never commenced broadcasting
 KTUW channel 16 (DT), Scottsbluff, Nebraska - digital subchannel
 KRRI-LP channel 25, Reno, Nevada
 KTVC channel 18 (DT), Roseburg, Oregon - digital subchannel
 KEAT-LP channel 22, Amarillo, Texas
 KEYU channel 31 (DT), Amarillo, Texas - digital subchannel
 WEVU-CA channel 4, Fort Myers, Florida
 KUSE-LP channel 58, Seattle, Washington

See also
 Desaparecidos (American TV series)

References

External links
 LAT TV official site (English) (defunct)
 LAT TV sitio oficial (Español) (defunct)

Television channels and stations established in 2006
Defunct television networks in the United States
Defunct television broadcasting companies of the United States
Television channels and stations disestablished in 2008
Spanish-language television networks in the United States